Deviya Vishwajit Rane is an Indian politician. She was elected to the Poriem Assembly constituency in the 2022 Goa Legislative Assembly election as a member of the Bharatiya Janata Party.

Personal life
Deviya Vishwajit Rane studied at the Bhatikar Model English School and the Parvatibai Chowgule College in Margao. She obtained her MBBS degree from the Goa Medical College. She is married to politician Vishwajit Rane.

References

Living people
Year of birth missing (living people)
Goa MLAs 2022–2027
Bharatiya Janata Party politicians from Goa
People from Goa